The Lambda Literary Award for Drama is an annual literary award, presented by the Lambda Literary Foundation to an LGBT-related literary or theatrical work. Most nominees are plays, or anthologies of plays; however, non-fiction works on theatre or drama have also sometimes been nominated for the award.

Honorees

References

External links

 Lambda Literary Awards

Dramatist and playwright awards
Drama
Lists of LGBT-related award winners and nominees
English-language literary awards